Climate Code Red: The Case for Emergency Action  is a 2008 book which presents scientific evidence that the global warming crisis is worse than official reports and national governments have so far indicated.  The book argues that we are facing a "sustainability emergency" that requires a clear break from business-as-usual politics. The authors explain that emergency action to address climate change is not so much a radical idea as an indispensable course we must embark upon. Climate Code Red draws heavily on the work of a large number of climate scientists, including James E. Hansen.

General
The key themes of Climate Code Red are:
"Our goal is a safe-climate future – we have no right to bargain away species or human lives."
"We are facing rapid warming impacts: the danger is immediate, not just in the future."
"For a safe climate future, we must take action now to stop emissions and to cool the earth."
"Plan a large-scale transition to a post-carbon economy and society."
"Recognise a climate and sustainability emergency, because we need to move at a pace far beyond business and politics as usual".

Co-author David Spratt is a Melbourne businessman, climate-policy analyst, and co-founder of the Carbon Equity network, and director of the Breakthrough - National Centre for Climate Restoration. Co-author Philip Sutton is convener of the Greenleap Strategic Institute and Assistant Convenor of the Climate Emergency Network.

The book was launched by the Governor of Victoria, Professor David de Kretser in Parliament House in Melbourne, Victoria, on July 17, 2008.

See also

List of Australian environmental books
Requiem for a Species
Greenhouse Solutions with Sustainable Energy

References

External links
Official website
The Case for a Sustainability Emergency: Philip Sutton interview (audio) - The Reality Report
The Case for a Sustainability Emergency: Philip Sutton interview (text) - Energy Bulletin

Coming clean on 'nice' coal
Review of Climate Code Red: Energy Bulletin

Environmental non-fiction books
2008 non-fiction books
2008 in the environment
Australian non-fiction books
Climate change books
Collaborative non-fiction books